Madron is a 1970 Western film directed by Jerry Hopper  and filmed in Israel; the first feature shot in Israel that was set in a non-Israeli location. 
It was nominated for an Academy Award for Best Original Song and a Golden Globe Award for Best Original Song in 1971 for the song "Till Love Touches Your Life" by Riz Ortolani (music) and Arthur Hamilton. It was a return to feature films and the final film of director Jerry Hopper.

Plot
A nun, the only survivor of an Indian massacre of a wagon train, is taken in by a cantankerous old gunfighter who helps her to evade the marauding Indians during her attempt to reach Santa Fe.
During the arduous journey they slowly develop an unlikely friendship and respect for each other despite Madron (Richard Boone) initially treating Sister Mary (Leslie Caron) very badly as merely a sex object.

Cast
 Richard Boone as Madron
 Leslie Caron as Sister Mary
 Gabi Amrani (credited as Gabi Armani) as Angel
 Paul L. Smith as Gabe Price
 Aharon Ipalé as Singer

References

External links
 

1970 films
1970 Western (genre) films
American Western (genre) films
Films directed by Jerry Hopper
Films shot in Israel
Films scored by Riz Ortolani
1970s English-language films
1970s American films